is a Japanese shōjo manga series written and illustrated by Noriko Sasaki. It was published from 1988 to 1993 in the magazine Hana to Yume, owned by Hakusensha, with a total of 12 volumes. It received a TV drama adaptation, which was aired on ANN from April to June 2003 and had 11 episodes.

Synopsis
Nishine Masaki, a young man from Hokkaido, is told by a mysterious man that he will become a veterinarian. Along with his best friend Nikaidou, and animal friends Chobi the dog, Mike the cat and Hiyo the rooster, Nishine sets out to fulfill his mysterious fate of becoming a veterinarian.

Reception
By 2020, the manga had 21.6 million copies in circulation.

References

External links
  

Shōjo manga
Hakusensha manga
Comedy anime and manga
Medical anime and manga